The Bolshoi were an English London-based music group prominent mostly in the mid to late 1980s. They are best known for the hits "Sunday Morning" and "A way" or "Away" (the name is interchangeable and has been noted as both on different albums/singles).

History
The band formed in 1984 in Trowbridge, Wiltshire, England. The original lineup consisted of singer/guitarist Trevor Tanner, drummer Jan Kalicki, and bassist Graham Cox.  Tanner and Kalicki had previously played together in the short-lived punk band Moskow, where Trevor performed as Trevor Flynn (his mother's maiden name). Early gigs supported the likes of the Cult, the March Violets and the Lords of the New Church. After eight gigs bass player Graham Cox was replaced by Nick Chown. In 1985, the band released their debut single, "Sob Story", followed by the mini-album, Giants, and their hit song "Happy Boy". Word of mouth was such that the Bolshoi were able to sell out many of their early headlining performances.

The band moved to London in 1985, and their line-up expanded to include Paul Clark on keyboards (born 12 June 1962, Leeds, Yorkshire). In 1986, they released their first full-length album, Friends, and expanded their touring schedule to the U.S., South America and Poland. It was followed in 1987 by the album Lindy's Party, on which the sound was more pop-oriented. TC Wall, reviewing the album in Underground magazine, described Lindy's Party as "completely confident, commercial, professional, and dangerously catchy" and "a fine album that'll be caressed for generations."

Stylistically, the Bolshoi were difficult to categorize. The band has been described as a proto-goth band, similar in their live act to fellow Beggars Banquet signees, Bauhaus. Tanner was recognized for his dark, pensive lyrics that belied a social responsibility and awareness.

After the release of Lindy's Party, the band recorded a fourth album, but problems with their record label management impeded its release, and they disbanded as the 1980s drew to a close. The previously unreleased fourth album, titled Country Life, had been lost for years, but has now been resurrected by Beggars Banquet with extensive help from Tanner's current record label-head and Creative Director, David Paul Wyatt Perko. This new release is now available as one of five CDs in Beggar's 5-CD box set, put out via Beggar's imprint, Arkive.

In December 2018, the Bolshoi's official Facebook page announced that Bolshoi frontman, Trevor Tanner, and Bolshoi keyboardist, Paul Clark, were developing a new project, tentatively titled, The Bolshoi Brothers.

In November 2022 The Bolshoi Brothers released Steam Funk, a track from their debut album scheduled for release in 2023, and also launched their website.

Discography

Studio Albums 

1985: GIANTS

  Fly (3:54)  
  Sliding Seagulls (4:52)  
  Hail Mary (4:12)  
  Giants (4:56)  
  Happy Boy (Original Mix) (6:07)  
  By The River (5:45)  
Bonus Tracks  
  Foxes (3:16)  
  M.F.P. (4:39)  
  Billy's New Boots (5:18)  
  Sob Story (4:07)  
  Amsterdam (2:56)  
  Crosstown Traffic (3:36)  
  Boxes (3:31)  
  Holiday By The Sea (4:41)  
  Away (Demo) (5:02)  
  Sunday Morning (Demo) (5:43)  
  Books On The Bonfire (Demo) (5:11)

1986: FRIENDS
 Away (4:57)  
 Modern Man (5:39)  
 Someone's Daughter (3:54)  
 Sunday Morning (6:35)  
 Looking For A Life To Lose (4:44)  
 Romeo In Clover (Call Girls) (5:39)  
 Books On The Bonfire (4:59)  
 Pardon Me (4:37)  
 Fat And Jealous (4:11)  
 Waspy (5:13)  
Bonus Tracks 
 A Funny Thing... (3:53)  
 Boss (4:13)  
 Razzle Dazzle (5:00)  
 Black Black Black (3:13)  
 Toys Xmas Party (2:44)  
 Pardon Me (Demo) (3:58)  
 Fat And Jealous (Demo) (3:14)

1987: LINDY'S PARTY 
 Auntie Jean (5:02)  
 Please (3:39)  
 Crack In Smile (6:09)  
 Swings And Roundabouts (3:51)  
 She Don't Know (4:56)  
 T.V. Man (4:39)  
 Can You Believe It (4:32)  
 Rainy Day (3:37)  
 Barrowlands (3:55)  
 Lindy's Party (5:45)  
Bonus Tracks  
 Please (12" Single Mix) (6:39)  
 West Of London Town (5:29)  
 T.V. Man (7" Single Edit) (3:38)  
 Strawberries And Cream (3:55)  
 I'm Depressed (We All Die) (4:25)

1988: COUNTRY LIFE (released 2015)
 World In Action (3:54) 
 Under The Shed (3:32)  
 What's Your Favourite Coulour (4:36)  
 Country Life (5:25)  
 We Don't Want Him Here (3:35)  
 Boy From The Nursery World (4:06)  
 Long Tall Sally In A Black Dress (4:32)  
 Too Late (6:05)  
 Out There In The Distance (6:32)  
 Castaway (5:47)  
 Delores Jones (6:03)  
 Yee Hee (4:55)  
 Madame Hecate (5:34)  
 Last Chance For The Slow Dance (4:19)  
 Everything Is Done For You Today (5:44)

Compilations
1990: Bigger Giants (Beggars Banquet Records)
1999: A Way - Best of the Bolshoi (Beggars Banquet Records)
2006: A Life Less Lived: The Gothic Box (Rhino Records)
2015: The Bolshoi 5 CD Box Set (The Arkive)

Singles
1985: "Sob Story"
1985: "Giants"
1985: "Happy Boy"
1986: "Books on the Bonfire"
1986: "Away"
1986: "Sunday Morning"
1987: "T.V. Man"
1987: "Away II"
1987: "Please"

References

External links

The Bolshoi Brothers

English post-punk music groups
English gothic rock groups
English alternative rock groups
English new wave musical groups
Musical groups established in 1983
Musical groups disestablished in 1988
Musical groups from Wiltshire
Situation Two artists
Beggars Banquet Records artists
I.R.S. Records artists